Ctenosaura flavidorsalis, commonly known as the yellow-backed spiny-tailed iguana, is a species of lizard in the family Iguanidae.

Distribution
It is found in El Salvador, Guatemala, and Honduras.

Habitat
Its natural habitat is subtropical or tropical dry forests.

Conservation status
It is threatened by habitat loss.

References

Ctenosaura
Reptiles described in 1994
Taxonomy articles created by Polbot
Reptiles of Central America
Taxa named by Gunther Köhler